LaBelle Valley is a valley,  long, between Peterson Terrace and Price Terrace in the Cruzen Range of Victoria Land. The valley opens south to Barwick Valley. Named by the Advisory Committee on Antarctic Names in 2005 after James W. LaBelle, Department of Physics and Astronomy, Dartmouth College; United States Antarctic Program principal investigator for the study of low, middle, and high frequency auroral radio noise observed at the Amundsen–Scott South Pole Station and at other observatories from 1991 to 2004.

References

Valleys of Victoria Land